The Bishopric of Samland (Sambia) was a bishopric in Samland (Sambia) in medieval Prussia. It was founded as a Roman Catholic diocese in 1243 by papal legate William of Modena. Its seat was Königsberg, until 1523 the episcopal residence was in Fischhausen. The bishopric became Lutheran in the 16th century during the Protestant Reformation and was eventually dissolved following the establishment of Ducal Prussia, a Protestant vassal duchy of the Kingdom of Poland.

The territory of the defunct bishopric of Samland came nominally under the jurisdiction of the Roman Catholic bishopric of Warmia in the 17th century, and the title of bishop of Samland was occasionally used by Warmian bishops. From 1617 to 1773, the Bishops of Warmia were the Catholic Apostolic administrators of Sambia. In 1821 Pope Pius VII formally dissolved the Diocese, and merged its territory with the Diocese of Warmia. Most of the area of the medieval bishopric of Sambia became a part of the Russian Kaliningrad Oblast in 1945 and is now under the jurisdiction of the Roman Catholic Archdiocese of Moscow. A small section around the town of Gołdap became again a part of Poland and maintains its ties to the Archdiocese of Warmia, being administered by its suffragan diocese of Ełk.

Samland cathedral chapter was established in Königsberg in 1285 and was dissolved in the 16th century together with the bishopric. In 1989, it was re-established as the Sambian Collegiate Chapter (Sambian Co-Cathedral Chapter since 1992) in Gołdap.

Bishops of Samland
 Dietrich I. 1252–1254
 Heinrich I. von Streitberg 1254–1274
 Hermann von Köln 1274–1276, † 1287
 Christian von Mühlhausen 1276–1295
 Siegfried von Regenstein 1295–1318
 Johann I. von Clare 1320–1344
 Jakob von Bludau 1344–1358
 (Jakob von Kulm 1344–1354)
 Bartholomäus von Radam 1354–1378
 Thilo von Marburg 1378–1386
 Heinrich II. Kuwal 1387–1395
 Heinrich III. von Seefeld 1395–1414
 Heinrich IV. von Schanenburg 1415–1416
 Johann II. von Saalfeld 1416–1425
 Michael Jung 1425–1442, † 1443
 Nikolaus I. Schlotterkopf 1442–1470
 Dietrich II. von Cuba 1470–1474
 Johann III. von Rehewinkel 1474–1497
 Nikolaus II. Krender 1497–1503
 Paul von Watt 1503–1505
 Günther von Bünau 1505–1518
 George of Polentz 1518–1550, turned it into a Lutheran bishopric
 Joachim Mörlin 1550–1571
 Tilemann Heshusius 1571–1577

Catholic Apostolic Administrators
Szymon Rudnicki 1617–1621
John Albert Vasa 1621–1633
Mikołaj Szyszkowski 1633–1643
Jan Karol Konopacki 1643–1644
Wacław Leszczyński 1644–1659
Jan Stefan Wydżga 1659–1679
Michał Stefan Radziejowski 1680–1688
Jan Stanisław Zbąski 1688–1697
Andrzej Chryzostom Załuski 1698–1711
Teodor Andrzej Potocki 1711–1723
Krzysztof Jan Szembek 1724–1740
Adam Stanisław Grabowski 1741–1766
Ignacy Krasicki 1767–1773

References

External links
 GCatholic.org

1243 establishments in Europe
Dioceses established in the 13th century
Former Roman Catholic dioceses
Christianity in Prussia
Religious organizations established in the 1240s
1577 disestablishments
Former Roman Catholic dioceses in Poland

de:Liste der Bischöfe von Samland